Rudzieniec  is a village in the administrative district of Gmina Milanów, within Parczew County, Lublin Voivodeship, in eastern Poland.

Notable people
Tomasz Zaliwski (1929–2006), film, radio, and theatre actor

References

Rudzieniec